"Can't You See That She's Mine" is the fourth single released in the United States by the Dave Clark Five. The song was written by Dave Clark and Mike Smith, and was the Dave Clark Five's fourth Gold Record.
The B-side "No Time To Lose" was taken from the previous Dave Clark Five album "Glad All Over".

Background
The middle four bars start with the lyric "People talk and try to break us up. Well we know they don't understand", which is a direct lift from the 1960 Ray Charles song "Sticks And Stones".

Cash Box described it as a "sizzling rocker...that should move up the charts in jet -speed fashion.."

Chart performance
"Can't You See That She's Mine" reached number four on the Billboard Hot 100 chart for the week of 18 July 1964. In the UK, the single rose to number 10 in June 1964.

References

1964 singles
The Dave Clark Five songs
1964 songs
Epic Records singles
Songs written by Mike Smith (Dave Clark Five)